Aviv Productions Inc. is a North American arts and entertainment agency, founded in 1994 and headed by Itzik Becher. The company has represented and managed Chava Alberstein, David Broza, Peter Yarrow, Peter, Paul and Mary, Tania Libertad, Jane Birkin, Julia Migenes, and Woody Allen and His New Orleans Band.  Aviv Productions has started a speakers bureau, representing Daniel Libeskind. It has produced some of David D'Or and Pnina Becher's CDs. The company coproduces the television concert special "Voices, A Musical Celebration" (2004).

References

External links
Website

American record labels
Record labels established in 1994